Maximilian Benassi is an Italian sprint canoeist who has competed since the late 2000s. He won the bronze medal in the K-1 5000 m event at the 2010 ICF Canoe Sprint World Championships in Poznań and another a year later in Szeged.

Benassi is an athlete of the Gruppo Sportivo Fiamme Gialle,

References

External links
Canoe'09.ca profile. 

Italian male canoeists
Living people
Canoeists at the 2012 Summer Olympics
Olympic canoeists of Italy
ICF Canoe Sprint World Championships medalists in kayak
1986 births
Canoeists of Fiamme Gialle
21st-century Italian people